This is a listing of notable people born in, or notable for their association with, Lampung.



H
 Zulkifli Hasan, politician (South Lampung Regency)

I
 Sri Mulyani Indrawati, economist, former Finance Minister of Indonesia, Managing Director of the World Bank Group (Bandar Lampung)

K
 Udo Z. Karzi, writer (West Lampung Regency)

Lampung